Robert "Bobby" Ward (born 21 October 1958) is a Scottish former footballer, who played for Celtic and Newport County.

Ward was considered a hot prospect at Celtic until a managerial change forced him to move to Newport County, where he played alongside legends such as John Aldridge and Tommy Tynan. Ward joined Newport County during the most successful period in the club's long history. Ward was part of the squad that won promotion and the Welsh Cup and in the subsequent season reached the quarter-final of the 1981 European Cup Winners Cup. They reached the quarter finals, losing 3–2 on aggregate to Carl Zeiss Jena of East Germany.

In 1981, he joined Scottish club Rutherglen Glencairn

References

1958 births
Living people
Footballers from Glasgow
Scottish footballers
English Football League players
Rutherglen Glencairn F.C. players
Celtic F.C. players
Newport County A.F.C. players
Association football forwards
Scottish Junior Football Association players